Air Fiji Flight 121 (PC121/FAJ121) was a scheduled domestic passenger flight from Nausori International Airport in Fiji's capital Suva to Nadi International Airport in  Nadi, operated by an Embraer EMB 110 Bandeirante. On 24 July 1999, the Bandeirante carrying 17 people consisting of 15 passengers and 2 crew crashed into a mountain near Delailasakau while en route to Nadi. The crash killed everyone on board, making it the deadliest aviation accident to occur in Fiji.

Accident
The Bandeirante took off from Nausori with 17 passengers and crews. The aircraft was carrying nine Fijians, five Australians, one New Zealander, one Chinese and one Japanese. 15 minutes after take off from Nausori International Airport, the aircraft slammed into the mountainside near Delailasakau, shortly after dawn. Radio contact was lost with the aircraft. At about 08:40, police received a call from the radio telephone operator from Windina to say that they heard a loud crash out in the hills, north of Nasevou village. Witnesses stated that they saw the aircraft was flying low, and shortly after slammed into the mountainside. One man stated that he heard a "cannonball" during the crash. He then saw parts from the tail fall down.

A search team was dispatched by the authorities. Shortly after, a helicopter spotted the wreckage of Flight 121. There were no signs of life on the crash site. Most bodies were severely mutilated, with witnesses describing many internal organs spread throughout the crash site. The area of the crash site was a remote area, forcing the rescuers to evacuate the bodies only by foot. The crash site is about six hours' walk from the nearest village, with few roads and no telephone links. Police operations director Jahir Khan said police would try to remove the bodies by 25 July. Lack of equipment hampered the evacuation process and several bodies were trapped in the wreckage had to be evacuated by cutting and removing the wreckage from the area.

Aircraft
The aircraft involved in the crash was an Embraer EMB 110 Bandeirante (Serial Number 110416) registered in Fiji as DQ-AFN. Powered by two Pratt & Whitney Canada PT6A-34 turboprop engines, the aircraft was first flown in 1983 and had flown a total of 22411 cycles. The aircraft was registered in America and Australia prior to being operated by Air Fiji.

Investigation
The Civil Aviation Authority of Fiji (CAAF) investigated the crash of Flight 121, with assistance from the Australian Transport Safety Bureau (ATSB). Interviews conducted by the CAAF found that witnesses stated that before the aircraft crashed, parts of its tail and wings fell down onto the forest, indicating a possible structural failure. The tail fin and horizontal stabilisers were found  to the left of the line of flight. This was consistent with a pre-impact structural failure, meaning that the aircraft may have broken up in the air before crashing to the ground. Specific investigations later found that the captain of Flight 121 may have been intoxicated. The brother of the captain stated that four hours before the crash the captain of the flight had been drinking alcohol. The investigation also revealed that the captain had insufficient rest and that he had consumed an above-therapeutic level of antihistamine prior to the flight. Air Fiji's Standard Operating Procedure was also found to be inadequate.

The tail section and right wing were found  from the main wreckage.

See also
Trans-Colorado Airlines Flight 2286
Crossair Flight 498
Aeroflot Flight 821

References

Transport in Fiji
Accidents and incidents involving the Embraer EMB 110 Bandeirante
Aviation accidents and incidents in 1999 
Aviation accidents and incidents in Fiji
1999 in Fiji
July 1999 events in Oceania
1999 disasters in Fiji